Nawa Shah is a town in the Islamabad Capital Territory of Pakistan. It is located at 33° 27' 50N 73° 25' 45E with an altitude of 642 metres (2109 feet).

References 

Union councils of Islamabad Capital Territory